Shelley Smith may refer to:

 Shelley Smith (sports reporter) (born 1958), American sports reporter
 Shelley Smith (actress) (born 1952), American fashion model and actress
 Shelley Smith (American football) (born 1987), American football player
 Shelley Smith (singer), British singer in The X Factor

See also
Shelley Taylor-Smith (born 1961), swimmer